We Love OPM: The Celebrity Sing-Offs (stylized as We ♥ OPM: The Celebrity Sing-Offs) is a Philippine reality music competition show on ABS-CBN network hosted by Anne Curtis with Eric Nicolas and mentored by Jay-R, Yeng Constantino, Nyoy Volante, KZ Tandingan, Erik Santos and Richard Poon. It premiered on ABS-CBN nationwide and worldwide on The Filipino Channel on May 14, 2016. It aired on ABS-CBN every Saturdays after MMK and Sundays after Rated K.

Fresh from the success of I Love OPM, this is the follow-up tribute to OPM. This time, they're giving tributes to OPM Icons.

After 10 weeks of completion, Erik Santos' team Tres Kantos was named Grand CelebriTeam after garnering 80.45% of the combined OPM Icon and public's votes (online and text). Tres Kantos won ₱2,000,000 (about £32,375, €38,750, US$42,750), half of which they donated to their chosen beneficiary, Casa San Miguel Foundation.

Celebrity Mentors
 Erik Santos - King of Teleserye, Prince of Pop & Movie Themesong
 Jay-R - King of R&B
 KZ Tandingan - Soul Supreme
 Nyoy Volante - King of Acoustic Pop
 Richard Poon - Philippines' Crooner
 Yeng Constantino - Pop Rock Superstar

Guest Mentor(s)
 Kyla - Queen of R&B (Substitute for Jay R) (Week 2, 4, 8 & 9)

CelebriTeams

Tres Kantos  by Erik Santos
Dominador Aviola aka Daddy D
Bugoy Drilon
Jovit Baldivino

O Diva  by KZ Tandingan
Liezel Garcia
Emmanuelle Vera
Klarisse De Guzman

Hot Spots  by Jay-R
Markki Stroem
Ryan Sy
Alex Diaz

Power Chords  by Nyoy Volante
Kaye Cal
Marlo Mortel
Marion Aunor

Voice Next Door by Richard Poon
Kyle Echarri
Bailey May
Juan Karlos Labajo

Oh My Girls  by Yeng Constantino
Ylona Garcia
Krissha Viaje
Alexa Ilacad

Episodes

Week 1 (May 14 and 15, 2016)

OPM Icon: Martin Nievera

Week 2 (May 21 and 22, 2016)

OPM Icon: Sharon Cuneta

- *Guest Mentor

Week 3 (May 28 and 29, 2016)

OPM Icon: Sonny Parsons with the rest of the Hagibis

Week 4 (June 4 and 5, 2016) 
OPM Icon: Gary Valenciano

- *Guest Mentor

Week 5 (June 12, 2016) 
Due to Saturday's episode being pre-empted to give way to the free TV premiere of Heneral Luna, the show only aired on Sunday and is composed of entirely duet performances.
OPM Icon: Rey Valera

Week 6 (June 18 and 19, 2016) 

OPM Icon: Rico J. Puno

Week 7 (June 25 and 26, 2016) 

OPM Icon: Aegis

Week 8 (July 2 and 3, 2016) 

OPM Icon: Vice Ganda

- *Guest Mentor

Week 9 (July 9 and 10, 2016)
OPM Icons: Jim Paredes and Boboy Garovillo of APO Hiking Society

- *Guest Mentor

Semi Finals (July 16, 2016) 

The Semi-Finals were held live from the Newport Performing Arts Theater in Resorts World Manila. Juan Karlos Labajo, one of the members of Voice Next Door was not present due to being a housemate in Pinoy Big Brother: Lucky 7.

Opening song: Tagumpay Nating Lahat by Lea Salonga

Performers: Celebriteams

Other performance: Ang Himig Natin by Juan de la Cruz Band

Performers: Celebriteam Mentors

OPM Icons: The Jukebox Queens (Claire de la Fuente, Eva Eugenio and Imelda Papin)

Grand Celebrity Sing Offs (July 17, 2016)

The Grand Celebrity Sing-Offs were held live from the Newport Performing Arts Theater in Resorts World Manila. However, one of the mentors, Richard Poon was not present due to prior commitments.

Opening song: Kay Ganda ng Ating Musika by Hajji Alejandro

Guest performer/s: Mitoy Yonting, Kean Cipriano, Mike Hanopol

Serenade song: Araw Gabi by Regine Velasquez

Guest performer/s: Sam Concepcion, Iñigo Pascual &  I Love OPM's Grand Touristar Yohan Hwang

OPM Icon: Ryan Cayabyab

Summary of Results 
The table below shows the corresponding total hearts (♥) earned per week:

Legend

References

ABS-CBN original programming
Philippine reality television series
2016 Philippine television series debuts
2016 Philippine television series endings
Filipino-language television shows